Koiak 1 - Coptic Calendar - Koiak 3

The second day of the Coptic month of Koiak, the fourth month of the Coptic year. On a common year, this day corresponds to November 28, of the Julian Calendar, and December 11, of the Gregorian Calendar. This day falls in the Coptic season of Peret, the season of emergence. This day falls in the Nativity Fast.

Commemorations

Saints 

 The departure of Abba Hor, the Monk 
 The departure of Abba Hermina, the Hermit

References 

Days of the Coptic calendar